Tafitoala is a small village on the Samoan island of Upolu. It is located on the central south coast of the island.

References

Populated places in Samoa